Whiteman Air Force Base is a United States Air Force base located just south of Knob Noster, Missouri, United States. The base is the current home of the B-2 Spirit bomber. It is named for 2nd Lt George Whiteman, who was killed during the attack on Pearl Harbor.

History

World War II
In 1942, the U.S. Army Air Corps selected the site of the present-day base to be the home of Sedalia Glider Base, a training base for WACO glider pilots. In May 1942, construction workers began building a railroad spur for the new air base in an area known to locals as the "Blue Flats" because of the color of the soil. The new railroad line was built by the Missouri Pacific Railroad. The base was officially opened on 6 August 1942. On 12 November 1942, the name was changed to Sedalia Army Air Field.

After the end of World War II, operations at the airfield declined, and many of the buildings were abandoned. In December 1947, the base was put on inactive status.

340th Bomb Wing
In August 1951, the base was renamed again, to Sedalia Air Force Base, as it was now part of the United States' newest military service branch, the US Air Force.

In October 1952, the base was turned over to the 340th Bombardment Wing. Improvements were made to the 1942 runway, as well as other base facilities, and Strategic Air Command (SAC) scheduled the base to receive squadrons flying the B-47 Stratojet and the KC-97 Stratofreighter. The first B-47 landed at the base in March 1954.

On 3 December 1955, the base was renamed Whiteman Air Force Base in honor of 2nd Lieutenant George A. Whiteman, an Army Air Corps pilot who was killed during the Japanese attack on Pearl Harbor while attempting to take off from Bellows Field. Whiteman was born in Longwood, Missouri, and graduated from Smith-Cotton High School in Sedalia, less than 20 miles from the base that would bear his name.

ICBM era
In 1963, Whiteman AFB transitioned from being a bomber base to a missile base. SAC activated the 351st Strategic Missile Wing at Whiteman on 1 February. On 1 September, having retired its B-47 and KC-97 aircraft, the remnants of the 340th Bombardment Wing were transferred to Bergstrom AFB, Texas where it assumed control of the B-52 Stratofortress and KC-135 Stratotanker assets of the inactivating 4130th Strategic Wing.

The transition of Whiteman AFB from a bomber base to missile base required massive military construction (MILCON) projects. 867,000 cubic yards of earth and rock were excavated to make room for underground launch facilities and 15 launch control centers. 168,000 yards of concrete, 25,355 tons of reinforcing steel, and 15,120 tons of structural steel were used in the effort, and a vast underground intersite cable network was installed.

The 351st employed the LGM-30 Minuteman weapons system, an ICBM capable of hitting targets up to 4300 miles away. In the mid-1960s, the Minuteman I missiles were swapped out in favor of the Minuteman II, an ICBM with increased range and an improved guidance system.

In the 1980s, Whiteman AFB became the first missile base to field an all-female Minuteman missile crew, as well as the first male and female Minuteman crew.

B-2 era
At the 1986 Reykjavik Summit between U.S. President Ronald Reagan and the new Soviet General Secretary Mikhail Gorbachev, the United States and the Soviet Union agreed to a drawdown of nuclear arms via two treaties: the INF Treaty and START I. This would lead to the eventual phase-out of the Minuteman II systems at Whiteman, and put the future of the base in question. On 5 January 1987, Ike Skelton, a U.S. Congressman representing Missouri's 4th district, announced that Whiteman AFB would be the home of the USAF's new Advanced Technology Bomber, which would eventually be called the B-2 Spirit.

On 30 November 1988, SAC announced that the 509th Bomb Wing would divest its FB-111 and KC-135 aircraft, relocate from its then-home station of Pease AFB, New Hampshire which was being realigned as an Air National Guard base pursuant to BRAC, and become the nation's first operational B-2 bomber unit. On 17 December 1993, Whiteman AFB's first B-2 touched down on the installation's runway. 21 B-2s would eventually be produced, 20 of which are still operational. All 20 are based at Whiteman AFB.

On 1 Apr 1994, the 442nd Fighter Wing of the Air Force Reserve Command relocated to Whiteman AFB with their A-10 Thunderbolt II aircraft to become a tenant command at Whiteman AFB following the BRAC-directed closure of their former home station, Richards-Gebaur AFB, Missouri.

On 10 December 2022, there was a crash involving a USAF B-2. There were no other details released by the government. As a result of this crash all B-2 planes have been grounded.

Based units 
Units marked GSU are Geographically Separate Units, which although based at Whiteman, are subordinate to a parent unit based at another location.

United States Air Force 
 

Air Force Global Strike Command (AFGSC)

 Eighth Air Force
 509th Bomb Wing (Host Wing)
 Headquarters 509th Bomb Wing
 509th Operations Group
 13th Bomb Squadron – B-2A Spirit, T-38A Talon
 393d Bomb Squadron – B-2A Spirit
 509th Operations Support Squadron
 509th Maintenance Group
 509th Aircraft Maintenance Squadron
 509th Maintenance Operations Flight
 509th Maintenance Squadron
 509th Munitions Squadron
 509th Medical Group
 509th Mission Support Group
 509th Civil Engineering Squadron
 509th Communications Squadron
 509th Contracting Squadron
 509th Force Support Squadron
 509th Logistics Readiness Squadron
 509th Security Forces Squadron

Air Combat Command (ACC)

Twelfth Air Force 
432nd Wing / 432nd Air Expeditionary Wing 
25th Attack Group 
 20th Attack Squadron (GSU) – MQ-9A Reaper
US Air Force Warfare Center
53rd Wing
53rd Test and Evaluation Group
72nd Test and Evaluation Squadron (GSU) – B-2A Spirit
57th Wing
US Air Force Weapons School
325th Weapons Squadron (GSU) – B-2A Spirit

Air Force Reserve Command (AFRC)

 Tenth Air Force
 442nd Fighter Wing
 Headquarters 442nd Fighter Wing
 442nd Operations Group
 303rd Fighter Squadron – A-10C Thunderbolt II
 442nd Operations Support Flight
 442nd Maintenance Group
 442nd Aircraft Maintenance Squadron
 442nd Maintenance Operations Flight
 442nd Maintenance Squadron
 442nd Mission Support Group
 442nd Civil Engineer Squadron
 442nd Communications Flight
 442nd Force Support Squadron
 442nd Logistics Readiness Squadron
 442nd Security Forces Squadron
 442nd Medical Squadron

Air National Guard (ANG)

 Missouri Air National Guard
 131st Bomb Wing
 Headquarters 131st Bomb Wing
 131st Operations Group
 110th Bomb Squadron – B-2A Spirit
 131st Operations Support Flight
 131st Maintenance Group
 131st Aircraft Maintenance Squadron
 131st Maintenance Squadron
 131st Maintenance Operations Flight
 131st Medical Group
 131st Mission Support Group
 131st Civil Engineer Squadron
 131st Communications Flight
 131st Contracting Squadron
 131st Force Support Squadron
 131st Logistics Readiness Squadron
 231st Civil Engineer Flight  
 239th Combat Communications Squadron

United States Army 
Missouri Army National Guard

 35th Infantry Division
 35th Combat Aviation Brigade
 135th Aviation Regiment
 1st Battalion (GSU) – AH-64 Apache

United States Navy 
Navy Expeditionary Combat Command (NECC)

 Coastal Riverine Force
 Coastal Riverine Group One
 Coastal Riverine Squadron 11 (GSU)

References

External links
Whiteman AFB official site
Historic American Engineering Record documentation, filed under Knob Noster, Johnson County, MO:

Historic American Engineering Record in Missouri
Installations of the United States Air Force
Johnson County, Missouri
Military installations in Missouri
Census-designated places in Johnson County, Missouri
Military installations established in 1942
1942 establishments in Missouri